Frederick William II (25 September 1744 – 16 November 1797) was King of Prussia from 1786 until his death in 1797. He was in personal union the Prince-elector of Brandenburg and (via the Orange-Nassau inheritance of his grandfather) sovereign prince of the Canton of Neuchâtel. Pleasure-loving and indolent, he is seen as the antithesis to his predecessor, Frederick the Great. (Frederick II).  Under his reign, Prussia was weakened internally and externally, and he failed to deal adequately with the challenges to the existing order posed by the French Revolution. His religious policies were directed against the Enlightenment and aimed at restoring a traditional Protestantism. However, he was a patron of the arts and responsible for the construction of some notable buildings, among them the Brandenburg Gate in Berlin.

Early life
Frederick William was born in Berlin, the son of Prince Augustus William of Prussia (the second son of King Frederick William I of Prussia) and Duchess Luise of Brunswick-Wolfenbüttel. His mother's elder sister, Elisabeth, was the wife of Augustus William's brother King Frederick II ("Frederick the Great"). Frederick William became heir-presumptive to the throne of Prussia on his father's death in 1758, since Frederick II had no children. The boy was of an easy-going and pleasure-loving disposition, averse to sustained effort of any kind, and sensual by nature.

His marriage with Elisabeth Christine of Brunswick-Wolfenbüttel, Crown Princess of Prussia, daughter of Charles I, Duke of Brunswick-Lüneburg, contracted 14 July 1765 in Charlottenburg, was dissolved in 1769. He then married Frederica Louisa of Hesse-Darmstadt, daughter of Ludwig IX, Landgrave of Hesse-Darmstadt on 14 July 1769 also in Charlottenburg. Although he had seven children by his second wife, he had an ongoing relationship with his mistress, Wilhelmine Enke (created Countess Wilhelmine von Lichtenau in 1796), a woman of strong intellect and much ambition, and had five children by her—the first when she was still in her teens.

Frederick William, before the corpulence of his middle age, was a man of singularly handsome presence, not without mental qualities of a high order; he was devoted to the arts – Boccherini, Mozart and the young Beethoven enjoyed his patronage, and his private orchestra had a Europe-wide reputation. He also was a talented cellist. But an artistic temperament was hardly what was required of a king of Prussia on the eve of the French Revolution, and Frederick the Great, who had employed him in various services (notably in an abortive confidential mission to the court of Russia in 1780), openly expressed his misgivings as to the character of the prince and his surroundings. For his part, Frederick William, who had never been properly introduced to diplomacy and the business of rulership, resented his uncle for not taking him seriously.

Reign

 
The misgivings of Frederick II appear justified in retrospect. Frederick William's accession to the throne (17 August 1786) was, indeed, followed by a series of measures for lightening the burdens of the people, reforming the oppressive French system of tax-collecting introduced by Frederick, and encouraging trade by the diminution of customs dues and the making of roads and canals. This gave the new king much popularity with the masses; the educated classes were pleased by Frederick Williams's reversal of his uncle's preference for the French language and the promotion of the German language, with the admission of German writers to the Prussian Academy, and by the active encouragement given to schools and universities. Frederick William also terminated his predecessor's state monopolies for coffee and tobacco and the sugar monopoly. Under his reign the codification known as Allgemeines Preußisches Landrecht, initiated by Frederick II, continued and was completed in 1794.

Mysticism and religious policies
In 1781 Frederick William, then prince of Prussia, inclined to mysticism, had joined the Rosicrucians, and had fallen under the influence of Johann Christoph von Wöllner and Johann Rudolf von Bischoffswerder. On 26 August 1786 Wöllner was appointed privy councillor for finance (Geheimer Oberfinanzrath), and on 2 October 1786 was ennobled. Though not in name, he in fact became prime minister; in all internal affairs it was he who decided; and the fiscal and economic reforms of the new reign were the application of his theories. Bischoffswerder, too, still a simple major, was called into the king's counsels; by 1789 he was already an adjutant-general. The opposition to Wöllner was, indeed, at the outset strong enough to prevent his being entrusted with the department of religion; but this too in time was overcome, and on 3 July 1788 he was appointed active privy councillor of state and of justice and head of the spiritual department for Lutheran and Catholic affairs. From this position Wöllner pursued long lasting reforms concerning religion in the Prussian state.

The king proved eager to aid Wöllner's crusade. On 9 July 1788 a religious edict was issued forbidding Evangelical ministers from teaching anything not contained in the letter of their official books, proclaimed the necessity of protecting the Christian religion against the "enlighteners" (Aufklärer), and placed educational establishments under the supervision of the orthodox clergy. On 18 December 1788 a new censorship law was issued to secure the orthodoxy of all published books. This forced major Berlin journals like Christoph Friedrich Nicolai's Allgemeine Deutsche Bibliothek and Johann Erich Biester's Berliner Monatsschrift to publish only outside the Prussian borders. Moreover, people like Immanuel Kant were forbidden to speak in public on the topic of religion.

Finally, in 1791, a Protestant commission was established at Berlin (Immediate-Examinationscommission) to watch over all ecclesiastical and scholastic appointments. Although Wöllner's religious edict had many critics, it was an important measure that, in fact, proved an important stabilizing factor for the Prussian state. Aimed at protecting the multi-confessional rights enshrined in the 1648 Peace of Westphalia, the provisions of Wöllner's edict were intended to safeguard against religious strife by imposing a system of state sponsored limits. The edict was also a notable step forward regarding the rights of Jews, Mennonites, and Herrnhut brethren, who now received full state protection. Given the confessional divides within Prussian society, primarily between Calvinists and Lutherans but increasingly Catholics as well, such a policy was important for maintaining a stable civil society.

In his zeal for establishing Prussia as a paragon of stable Christian statehood, Frederick William outstripped his minister; he even blamed Wöllner's "idleness and vanity" for the inevitable failure of the attempt to regulate opinion from above, and in 1794 deprived him of one of his secular offices in order that he might have more time "to devote himself to the things of God"; in edict after edict the king continued to the end of his reign to make regulations "in order to maintain in his states a true and active Christianity, as the path to genuine fear of God".

Foreign policies

The attitude of Frederick William II towards the army and foreign policy proved fateful for Prussia. The army was the very foundation of the Prussian state, as both Frederick William I and Frederick the Great had fully realised. The army had been their first care, and its efficiency had been maintained by their constant personal supervision. Frederick William II had no taste for military matters and put his authority as "Warlord" (Kriegsherr) into commission under a supreme college of war (Oberkriegs-Collegium) under the Duke of Brunswick and General Wichard Joachim Heinrich von Möllendorf. It was the beginning of the process that ended in 1806 at the disastrous Battle of Jena. Although the Prussian army reached its highest peacetime level of manpower under Frederick William II (189,000 infantry and 48,000 cavalry), under his reign the Prussian state treasury incurred a substantial debt, and the quality of the troops' training deteriorated.

Under the circumstances, Frederick William's interventions in European affairs were of little benefit to Prussia. The Dutch campaign of 1787, entered into for purely family reasons, was indeed successful, but Prussia received not even the cost of her intervention. An attempt to intervene in the war of Russia and Austria against the Ottoman Empire failed to achieve its objective; Prussia did not succeed in obtaining any concessions of territory, and the dismissal of minister Hertzberg (5 July 1791) marked the final abandonment of the anti-Austrian tradition of Frederick the Great.

Meanwhile, the French Revolution alarmed the ruling monarchs of Europe, and in August 1791 Frederick William, at the meeting at Pillnitz Castle, agreed with Emperor Leopold II to join in supporting the cause of King Louis XVI of France. However the king's character and the confusion of the Prussian finances could not sustain effective action in this regard. A formal alliance was indeed signed on 7 February 1792, and Frederick William took part personally in the campaigns of 1792 and 1793, but the king was hampered by want of funds, and his counsels were distracted by the affairs of a deteriorating Poland, which promised a richer booty than was likely to be gained by the anti-revolutionary crusade into France. A subsidy treaty with the sea powers (Great Britain and the Netherlands, signed at The Hague, 19 April 1794) filled Prussia's coffers, but at the cost of a promise to supply 64,000 land troops to the coalition. The insurrection in Poland that followed the partition of 1793, and the threat of unilateral intervention by Russia, drove Frederick William into the separate Treaty of Basel with the French Republic (5 April 1795), which was regarded by the other great monarchies as a betrayal, and left Prussia morally isolated in the struggle between the monarchical principle and the new republican creed of the Revolution. Although the land area of the Prussian state reached a new peak under his rule after the third partition of Poland in 1795, the new territories included parts of Poland such as Warsaw that had virtually no German population, severely straining administrative resources due to various pro-Polish revolts; it also removed the last remaining buffer state between Prussia and Russia.

Personal life and patronage of the arts

Frederick William's first marriage, to Elisabeth Christine of Brunswick (his first cousin) had ended after four years during which both spouses had been unfaithful.  Their uncle, Frederick II, granted a divorce reluctantly, as he was more fond of Elisabeth than of Frederick William. His second marriage lasted until his death, but he continued his relationship with Wilhelmine Enke. In 1794–1797 he had a castle built for her on the Pfaueninsel. Moreover, he was involved in two more (bigamist) morganatic marriages: with Elisabeth Amalie, Gräfin von Voß, Gräfin von Ingenheim in 1787 and (after her death in 1789) with Sophie Juliane Gräfin von Dönhoff. He had another seven children with those two women, which explains why his people also called him der Vielgeliebte ("the much loved") and der dicke Lüderjahn ("the fat scallywag"). His favourite son—with Wilhelmine Enke—was Graf Alexander von der Mark. His daughter from Sophie Juliane, Countess Julie of Brandenburg (4 January 1793, Neuchâtel – 29 January 1848, Vienna), married to Frederick Ferdinand, Duke of Anhalt-Köthen.

Other buildings constructed under his reign were the Marmorpalais in Potsdam and the world-famous Brandenburger Tor in Berlin.

On 16 November 1797, Frederick William II died in Potsdam. He was succeeded by his son, Frederick William III, who had resented his father's lifestyle and acted swiftly to deal with what he considered the immoral state of the court. Frederick William II is buried in the Berliner Dom.

Ancestry

Children
Frederick William II had the following children:
 By his first cousin Duchess Elisabeth Christine of Brunswick-Wolfenbüttel:
 Princess Frederica Charlotte (1767-1820), who became Duchess of York and Albany by her marriage to Prince Frederick, Duke of York and Albany, no issue
 By Princess Frederica Louisa of Hesse-Darmstadt:
 Frederick William III (1770–1840), married Duchess Louise of Mecklenburg-Strelitz, had issue
 Princess Christine (1772–1773)
 Prince Louis Charles (1773–96), married Duchess Frederica of Mecklenburg-Strelitz, had issue
 Princess Wilhelmine (1774-1837), who became Queen of the Netherlands by her marriage to King William I of the Netherlands, had issue
 Princess Augusta (1780–1841), who became Electress of Hesse by her marriage to William II, Elector of Hesse, had issue
 Prince Henry (1781–1846)
 Prince William (1783–1851), married Princess Maria Anna of Hesse-Homburg, had issue

References

|-

1744 births
1797 deaths
18th-century Kings of Prussia
People from Berlin
Kings of Prussia
Prince-electors of Brandenburg
Princes of Neuchâtel
House of Hohenzollern
German landowners
German Calvinist and Reformed Christians
People of the Patriottentijd
Burials at Berlin Cathedral
Rosicrucians
18th-century German people
Prussian people of the Kościuszko Uprising
Honorary members of the Saint Petersburg Academy of Sciences
Conservatism in Germany
Brandenburgian nobility